Stadlau may refer to:

 Stadlau, Vienna, in Donaustadt district
  WAT Stadlau, an ice hockey team in Vienna, Austria
  FC Stadlau, a football team in Vienna, Austria
  Stadlau (Vienna U-Bahn), a station on line U2